Morata de Jiloca is a municipality on the river Jiloca, located in the province of Zaragoza, Aragon, Spain. At the 2018 census (INE), the municipality had a population of 282 inhabitants.

See also
Comunidad de Calatayud

References

Municipalities in the Province of Zaragoza